Elena Tornikidou (born 27 May 1965) is an Uzbekistani-Russian former basketball player who competed in the 1992 Summer Olympics. She played for the Detroit Shock of the Women's National Basketball Association (WNBA) from 1999 to 2001.

References

1965 births
Living people
Sportspeople from Tashkent
Russian women's basketball players
Uzbekistani women's basketball players
Pontic Greeks
Uzbekistani people of Greek descent
Soviet people of Greek descent
Russian people of Greek descent
Olympic basketball players of the Unified Team
Basketball players at the 1992 Summer Olympics
Olympic gold medalists for the Unified Team
Olympic medalists in basketball
Soviet women's basketball players
Medalists at the 1992 Summer Olympics
Forwards (basketball)
Ros Casares Valencia players
Detroit Shock players
Undrafted Women's National Basketball Association players